Cary Anthony Stayner (born August 13, 1961) is an American serial killer and the older brother of kidnapping victim Steven Stayner. He was convicted of the murders of four women between February and July 1999: Carole Sund, her teenage daughter Juli Sund and their teenage traveling companion Silvina Pelosso, and Yosemite Institute naturalist Joie Ruth Armstrong.

The murders occurred in Mariposa County, California near Yosemite National Park. Stayner was sentenced to death for the four murders and remains on death row at San Quentin State Prison in California.

Early life 

Cary Stayner was born and raised in Merced, California. His seven-year-old brother, Steven Stayner, was kidnapped by child molester Kenneth Parnell in 1972, when Cary was 11, and held captive for more than seven years before escaping and being reunited with his family. Cary later said that he felt neglected while his parents grieved over the loss of Steven.

When Steven escaped Parnell and returned home in 1980, he received massive media attention. A true crime book and TV movie, both titled I Know My First Name Is Steven, were made about the ordeal. Steven died in a motorcycle accident in 1989. The following year, Cary's uncle, Jesse, with whom he was living at the time, was murdered. Cary later claimed that Jesse molested him around the same time that Steven was kidnapped.

Stayner is reported to have attempted suicide in 1991, and was arrested in 1997 for possession of marijuana and methamphetamine, although these charges were eventually dropped.

Killings 
In 1997, Stayner was hired as a handyman at the Cedar Lodge motel in El Portal, California, just outside the Highway 140 entrance to Yosemite National Park. Between February and July 1999, he murdered two women and two teenagers: 42-year-old Carole Sund; her daughter, 15-year-old Juli Sund; Juli's friend, 16-year-old Argentine exchange student Silvina Pelosso; and Yosemite Institute employee Joie Ruth Armstrong, a 26-year-old naturalist.

The first two victims, Carole Sund and Pelosso, were found in the trunk of the charred remains of Sund's Pontiac rental car. The bodies were burned beyond recognition and were identified using dental records. A note was sent to the police with a hand-drawn map indicating the location of the third victim, Sund's daughter Juli. The top of the note read, "We had fun with this one." Investigators went to the location depicted on the map and found the remains of Juli, whose throat had been cut.

Detectives began interviewing employees of the Cedar Lodge motel where the first three victims had been staying just before their deaths. One of those employees was Stayner, but he was not considered a suspect at that point because he had no criminal history and remained calm during the police interview.

When the decapitated body of Joie Ruth Armstrong was found, eyewitnesses said they saw a blue 1972 International Scout parked outside the cabin where she was staying. Detectives traced this vehicle to Stayner, which led to him becoming the prime suspect in the case. FBI agents John Boles and Jeff Rinek found Stayner staying at the Laguna del Sol nudist resort in Wilton, where he was arrested and taken to Sacramento for questioning. During his interrogation, Stayner shocked the agents when he confessed not only to Armstrong's decapitation but to the murders of Pelosso and the Sunds and the sending of the map for finding Juli Sund's body. His vehicle yielded evidence proving his link to Armstrong.

Stayner claimed after his arrest that he had fantasized about murdering women since he was seven years old, long before the abduction of his brother.

Trial and conviction 

Stayner was tried in federal court for Armstrong's murder since it occurred on federal land. To avoid a possible death sentence, he pleaded guilty to premeditated first-degree murder, felony first-degree murder, kidnapping resulting in death, and attempted aggravated sexual abuse resulting in death. During the sentencing hearing, Stayner stunned the courtroom when he suddenly broke down in tears and apologized. "I wish I could take it back, but I can’t," he said. "I wish I could tell you why I did such a thing, but I don’t even know myself. I’m so sorry. I wish there was a reason. But there isn’t. It’s senseless." Lesli Armstrong, Armstrong's mother, started crying as she listened to Stayner, and said afterward that she believed his apology was genuine. Stayner was sentenced to life in prison without parole.

Stayner pleaded not guilty by reason of insanity to the other murders in state court. His lawyers claimed that the Stayner family had a history of sexual abuse and mental illness, manifesting itself not only in the murders, but also his obsessive-compulsive disorder and his request to be provided with child pornography in return for his confession. Dr. Jose Arturo Silva testified that Stayner had obsessive-compulsive disorder, mild autism, and paraphilia. He was nevertheless found sane and convicted of three counts of first degree murder with special circumstances and one count of kidnapping by a jury on August 27, 2002.

After being  sentenced to death for the brutal killings, Stayner has been housed at the Adjustment Center on death row at San Quentin State Prison in California since 2002. Stayner remains on death row  though there have been no executions in California since a 2006 court ruling over flaws in the administration of capital punishment in the state.

Media portrayals 

 Stayner's case was featured in an episode of American Justice produced in 2002.
 In 2011, Stayner's investigation and arrest were featured in an episode of FBI: Criminal Pursuit, titled "Trail of Terror", airing on Investigation Discovery.
 In 2013, the history of Stayner's progress from student to the convicted murderer was told in an episode of the U.K. television series Born to Kill? titled, "Yosemite Park Slayer."
 The American Court TV (now TruTV) television series Mugshots released an episode on the Stayner case titled "Cary Stayner – The Cedar Lodge Killings".
 In 2018, the Reelz channel aired an hour-long documentary about the murders titled Yosemite Park Killer.
 On January 26, 2019, ABC News broadcast a 20/20 episode covering the Stayner brothers, titled "Evil in Eden".
 August 30, 2020 HLN aired "The Yosemite Murders: The Missing Women (Part 1)" and "The Yosemite Murders: The Evil Side (Part 2)", from the documentary series How It Really Happened.
 October 31, 2020, Casefile, an Australian true crime podcast, released the first of two episodes on Stayner with the title "The Yosemite Sightseer Murders." The second episode was released on November 7, 2020. The podcast released an episode on Steven Stayner's kidnapping earlier in 2020.
 April 2022, a Hulu three-part documentary "Captive Audience: A Real American Horror Story" focused on the lives of Steven and Cary Stayner.

See also 
 List of serial killers in the United States

Further reading 

 
 
 
  — Excerpts from Stayner's confession.

References

External links 
 Documentary series from Court TV (now TruTV) "MUGSHOTS: Cary Stayner -The Cedar Lodge Killings" episode (2002) at FilmRise

1961 births
20th-century American criminals
American male criminals
American murderers of children
American people convicted of murder
American prisoners sentenced to death
American rapists
American serial killers
Crime in California
Criminals from California
Living people
Male serial killers
People convicted of murder by California
People convicted of murder by the United States federal government
People convicted under the Federal Kidnapping Act
People from Merced, California
People on the autism spectrum
People with obsessive–compulsive disorder
Prisoners sentenced to death by California
Prisoners sentenced to life imprisonment by the United States federal government
Violence against women in the United States
Yosemite National Park